Bread and Honey (1970) is a novel for children by Australian author Ivan Southall, illustrated by Wolfgang Grasse.  It won the Children's Book of the Year Award: Older Readers in 1971. It is also known by the alternative title Walk a Mile and Get Nowhere.

Plot outline
Michael Cameron is a thirteen-year-old boy living in a small country town with his father and grandmother after the death of his mother. On a wet ANZAC Day, Michael meets and defends a nine-year-old girl from a local bully, and comes to appreciate the attitude of the adults around him and his place in the world.

Critical reception
Gwen Hutchings in The Canberra Times noted that the lead character's "problems hinge on the introspective and his innocent view of people in an every-day world, until the sham of it all is revealed in a moment of
truth and he is a better person for knowing it. The idea shows purpose and the narrative is less emotional than in some previous novels."

See also
 1970 in Australian literature

References

Australian children's novels
1970 Australian novels
CBCA Children's Book of the Year Award-winning works
1970 children's books
Angus & Robertson books